Bobby Joe Morrow (October 15, 1935May 30, 2020) was an American sprinter who won three gold medals at the 1956 Olympics. He has been called "the dominant sprinter of the 1950s" and "the most relaxed sprinter of all time, even more so than his hero Jesse Owens".

Early life
Morrow was born in Harlingen, Texas, on October 15, 1935, and raised on a cotton and carrot farm on the outskirts of San Benito, Texas. Before becoming a sprinter, Morrow played football for San Benito High School. Morrow also was a sprinter at Abilene Christian University, and became a member of the men's club Frater Sodalis in 1955.

Career
Morrow won the 1955 AAU 100-yard title. His most successful season was in 1956, when he was chosen by Sports Illustrated as "Sportsman of the Year". Morrow won the sprint double in the national college championships and defended his AAU title. Morrow then went to the 1956 Summer Olympics in Melbourne, where he won three gold medals and was the leader of the American sprint team. First, he was victorious in the 100-meter dash. He then led an American sweep of the medals in the 200-meter dash, while equaling the world record at that distance with a time of 20.6 seconds (unofficially auto-timed at 20.75). He won his third gold by anchoring the 4 × 100-meter relay team to a world record time. He was the first sprinter since Jesse Owens in 1936 to win gold medals in those three events.

Morrow achieved great fame after winning his three gold medals, and was featured on the covers of Life and SPORT, as well as Sports Illustrated. He appeared on The Ed Sullivan Show and Arthur Godfrey and His Friends, and addressed a joint session of the Texas legislature.

Morrow's success on a national level continued after the Olympics, but he retired in 1958 to become a farmer and a woodworker. He made a short comeback before the 1960 Olympic Games, but failed to qualify for the U.S. Olympic team.

Legacy
In October 2006, San Benito High School named its new 12,000 seat sporting facility in San Benito, used for football and soccer, Bobby Morrow Stadium. Morrow was on hand to help dedicate the new facility. He was inducted into the National Track and Field Hall of Fame in 1989 and into the Texas Track and Field Coaches Hall of Fame in 2016.

Personal life

Morrow was married to Jo Ann Strickland, whom he met in high school, in what was described as a "fairy-tale marriage". They moved to Odessa, and later to Houston, where he restarted his career in banking that he had put on hold to train for the 1960 Olympics. They divorced around 1968. He subsequently moved to Ohio, where he met and married Judy.

Morrow died of natural causes on May 30, 2020, at his home in Harlingen, Texas, at the age of 84.

References

External links

 
 
 
 

1935 births
2020 deaths
Abilene Christian Wildcats men's track and field athletes
American members of the Churches of Christ
American male sprinters
World record setters in athletics (track and field)
Athletes (track and field) at the 1956 Summer Olympics
James E. Sullivan Award recipients
Sportspeople from Abilene, Texas
People from Harlingen, Texas
Track and field athletes from Texas
Medalists at the 1956 Summer Olympics
Olympic gold medalists for the United States in track and field
People from San Benito, Texas
USA Outdoor Track and Field Championships winners